Delta State is a state in the  South-South geopolitical zone  of Nigeria. Named after the Niger Delta—a large part of which is in the state—the state was formed from the former Bendel State on August 27, 1991. Bordered on the north by Edo State, the east by Anambra and Rivers States, and the south by Bayelsa State while to the west is the Bight of Benin which covers about 160 kilometres of the state's coastline. The State was initially created with 12 local government areas in 1991 which was later extended to 19 and now has 25 local government areas. Asaba as its state capital is located along the River Niger on the northeastern end of the State, while the state's economic centre is the twin cities of Warri and Uvwie

Of the 36 states, Delta is the 23rd largest in area and twelfth most populous with an estimated population of over 5.6 million as of 2016. Geographically, the state is divided between the Central African mangroves in the coastal southwest and the Nigerian lowland forests in most of the rest of the state as a small portion of the Niger Delta swamp forests are in the far south. The other important geographical features are the River Niger and its distributary, the Forçados River, which flow along Delta's eastern and southern borders, respectively; while fellow Niger distributary, the Escravos River, runs through Warri and the coastal areas are riddled with dozens of smaller Niger distributaries that make up much of the western Niger Delta. Much of the state's nature contain threatened dwarf crocodile, Grey parrot, African fish eagle, mona monkey, and African manatee populations along with potentially extirpated populations of African leopard and Nigeria-Cameroon chimpanzee. Offshore, the state is also biodiverse as there are populations of Lesser African threadfin, crabs, and blue mussel along with various cetacean species.

What is now Delta State is made up of seven distinct ethnic groups, including the Urhobos occupying the delta central senatorial district; Ukwuani, Ika, and Aniocha-Oshimili (Igbo) occupying the delta north senatorial district; the isokos,Ijaws, and the Itsekiris occupying the delta south senatorial district and also other minor tribes which includes; the Olukumi,  igalas; found in the delta north region, that have been quite assimilated by the larger igbo group. In the pre-colonial period, now-Delta State was divided into various monarchial states like the Kingdom of Warri and Agbor Kingdom before the area became a part of the British Oil Rivers Protectorate in 1884. In the early 1900s, the British incorporated the protectorate (now renamed the Niger Coast Protectorate) into the Southern Nigeria Protectorate which later amalgamated into British Nigeria. However, colonial forces did not gain permanent control of modern-day Delta State until the 1910s, due to the uprisings of the Ekumeku Movement. Notably, Delta has one of the few parts of now-Nigeria to have been under French control as the UK leased the enclave of Forcados to France from 1903 to 1930.

After independence in 1960, the area of now-Delta was a part of the post-independence Western Region until 1963 when the region was split and the area became part of the Mid-Western Region. In 1967, the Igbo-majority of former Eastern Region attempted to secede as the state of Biafra and invaded the Mid-Western Region in an attempt to capture Lagos and end the war quickly; Biafran forces were halted and eventually pushed back but briefly declared the captured Mid-Western Region (including now-Delta State) as the Republic of Benin. During the occupation there were widespread hostilities between the Biafran forces and the mainly non-Igbo inhabitants of now-Delta State. Upon the liberation of the Mid-West, Nigerian forces committed the Asaba massacre against ethnic Igbos in Asaba. At the war's end and the reunification of Nigeria, the Mid-Western Region was reformed until 1976 when it was renamed Bendel State. In 1991, Bendel State was split with the north becoming Edo State and the south becoming Delta State.

Economically, Delta State  is based around the production of crude oil and natural gas as one of the main oil-producing states in the country. Key minor industries involve agriculture as the state has substantial oil palm, yam, and cassava crops along with fishing and heliciculture. In large part due to its vast oil revenues, Delta has the fourth highest Human Development Index in the country; however, disputes between oil companies and local communities along with years of systemic corruption have led to hostilities that are often tied to the lack of development in host communities.

Geography 
The state lies approximately between 5°00' and 6°45' E and 5°00' and 6°30' N. It is geographically located in Nigeria's Midwest, bounded in the north and west by Edo State, the east by Anambra, Imo, and Rivers States, southeast by Bayelsa State, and on the southern extreme is the Bight of Benin which covers about 160 kilometres of the state's coastline. Delta State is generally low-lying without any remarkable hills. The state has a wide coastal belt inter-laced with rivulets and streams, which form part of the Niger Delta.

History 
Delta State was defined out of the former Bendel State on 27 August 1991. The state was actualized following agitations for the realization of a separate distinct state by the peoples of the old Delta Province.  There was yet another state request proposed as "Anioma State" comprising the Asaba and Agbor Divisions of the old Midwest region. The then Military President, Gen. Ibrahim Babangida, recognized Delta state but chose "Asaba" a prominent town within the "Northwestern Lower Niger" as capital city. The proposed capital was a virgin land in the heart of the two constituent divisions that constitutes the Northwestern Lower Niger. Delta state was once integrated in the Mid Western state from 1963 to 1976 and later Bendel state, from 1976 to 1991. The name "Bendel" (Ben-Del) was coined from the old Benin and Delta Provinces of Western Region-Delta to reflect the integration of Benin and Delta provinces.

Politics 
The State government is led by a democratically elected governor who works closely with members of the state's house of assembly. The Capital city of the State is Asaba.

Electoral system 
The electoral  system of each state is selected using a modified two-round system. To be elected in the first round, a candidate must receive the plurality of the vote and over 25% of the vote in at least two -third of the State local government Areas. If no candidate passes threshold, a second round will be held between the top candidate and the next candidate to have received a plurality of votes in the highest number of local government Areas.

Demographics 
Delta State is predominantly inhabited by the Urhobo, Igbo, Isoko, Ijaw, Ukwuani, Ika, Itsekiri and the Olukumi people. The population of other groups in the state are negligible.

The Urhobo-Isoko are basically the same people and are the most predominant people inhabiting the state and currently about 2.6 million spanning across 10 local government areas, followed by Ukwuani, Ika and Aniocha-Oshimili(Igbo) people of Delta State with a population of about 1.8 million spanning across 9 Local government areas who are sometimes referred to as the Anioma people. The Itsekiri speak a language very closely related to Yoruba but have been culturally influenced by the Edo from neighbouring Edo state, as well as the Urhobo, and Ijaw. The Ijaws are a group of people related to the predominant people of neighbouring Bayelsa State, while the Olukumi are becoming culturally and linguistically extinct, due to acculturation and assimilation.

The vast majority of inhabitants are Christian, with very few practicing traditional religions.

Administration

Senator Dr. Arthur Okowa Ifeanyi, a member of the People's Democratic Party, was elected Governor and chief executive of Delta State in April 2015. His deputy is Barr. Kingsley Otuaro. The state has three National Senatorial Districts (South, North and Central).  In 2011 and 2013, the elected senators were James Manager, 
Arthur Okowa Ifeanyi and Emmanuel Aguariavwodo who replaced Pius Ewherido who died in 2013 at National Hospital, Abuja. In 2015, Chief Ighoyeta Amori was elected Senator of Delta Central but his election was annulled and Senator
Ovie Omo-Agege sworn in as Senator of Delta Central, James Manager retained his position and Chief Peter Nwaoboshi was elected Senator of Delta North. The Executive, Legislative and Judicial Chambers are housed in Asaba with a government house annex in Warri.

Past & present administrations
Ifeanyi Okowa - 29 May 2015 to date (PDP)
Emmanuel Uduaghan - 29 May 2007 to 29 May 2015 (PDP)
James Ibori - 29 May 1999 to 29 May 2007 (PDP)
Walter Feghabo - 12 August 1998 to 29 May 1999 (Military)
John Dungs - 22 August 1996 to 12 August 1998 (Military)
Ibrahim Kefas - 26 September 1994 to 22 August 1996 (Military)
Bassey Asuquo - 10 December 1993 to 26 September 1994 (Military)
Abdulkadir Shehu - 17 November 1993 - 10 December 1993 (Military)
Luke Chijiuba Ochulor - 28 August 1991 - January 1992 (Military)
Felix Ibru - January 1992 - November 1993 (SDP)

Local Government Areas

Delta State consists of 25 Local Government Areas (shown with 2006 population figures):

Local Governments/Indigenous people 
Indigenous ethnic groups of Delta State listed by LGA:

Natural resources 

There are various solid mineral deposits within the state - industrial clay, silica, lignite, kaolin, tar sand, decorative rocks, limestone, etc. These are raw materials for industries such as brick making, ceramics, bottle manufacturing, glass manufacturing, chemical/insulators production, chalk manufacturing and sanitary wares, decorative stone cutting and quarrying, but these minerals are under-utilized.

Delta state also has huge deposits of crude oil and is also one of the largest producers of petroleum products in Nigeria. Sales of petroleum products is what majorly drives its economy.

Higher education 

Institutions of higher learning in Delta state include: 
Federal University of Petroleum Resources,Effurun
Delta State University, Abraka
Delta State University of Science and Technology, Ozoro
University of Delta, Agbor
Delta State Polytechnics (two different Polytechnics, one at Oghara, and one at Ogwashi-Uku)
The Film and Broadcast Academy, Ozoro
College of Education Warri.
Federal College of Education Technical, Asaba
College of Education, Mosogar
Delta State College of Health Technology, Ofuoma, Ughelli
Petroleum Training Institute, Effurun
Western Delta University, Oghara
Novena University, Ogume-Amai
National Open University of Nigeria (three study centres, one at Asaba, one at Emevor and another at Owhrode).
Delta State School of Marine Technology, Burutu
Nigeria Maritime University, Okerenkoko, Warri South West
Conarina School of Maritime & Transport Technology, Oria-Abraka
University of Information and Communication Technology, Agbor
State School of Midwifery, Asaba
School of Nursing (two schools, one at Agbor and another at Warri)
Baptist School of Nursing, Eku
Edwin Clark University, Kiagbodo
Eagle Heights University, Omadino, Warri
Admiralty University of Nigeria at Ibusa and Sapele

Tourist attractions 
Delta State has some historical, cultural and socio-political tourist centres that attract visitors from around the globe. Some of these sites of tourism include:
 The Nana's Palace built by Chief Nana Olomu of Ebrohim. He was a powerful 19th-century indigenous entrepreneur who traded with the British. The relationship eventually turned sour. Later, he surrendered (not without putting up a fight) and was exiled to Ghana. His personal effects are housed in this grand palace.
 The River Ethiope  which is reputed to be the deepest inland waterway in Africa (at 176 km). Its source is at the foot of a giant silk-cotton tree at Umuaja in Ukwuani Local Government Area of the state and flows through seven Local Government Areas in the State. It is a place of worship for Olokun traditional religion and also a common site for faithful of the Igbe Religious Movement.
 The Araya Bible Site  which houses a copy of the Holy Bible. It is believed that the bible descended to this spot miraculously from heaven around August 1914. The bible dropped on rain-soaked yam and it didn't get wet. The site now attracts thousands of Christians yearly.
 Demas Nwoko Edifice  which was built using traditional materials, designs and construction techniques of the Igbo civilization by Demas Nwoko, an architect, builder and artist of international repute from Idumuje-Ugboko, in Aniocha North Local Government Area, Delta State.
  The Mungo Park House'' which is now the site of the National Museum, Asaba. The house was constructed by the Royal Niger Company (RNC) in 1886 and was used as a colonial administrative headquarters, a military house, the colonial administrative divisional headquarters, the RNC Constabulary building,  and the seat of the Urban District Council at different times.
 The Ogulagha Beach The Niger Bridge which connects Delta State (by extension, western Nigeria) to the Eastern part of Nigeria. It is a beauty to behold. It was completed in 1965 and cost £5 million. It was damaged during the civil war but later repaired.
 Lander Brothers Anchorage, Asaba which was built in memory of early British explorers. The complex has a museum, a graveyard, and many artworks and writings. It houses a replica of one of the boats that was used by the brothers.
 Falcorp Mangrove Park Warri Kingdom Royal Cemetery''' which is a 512-year-old burial ground and serves as the resting place of past rulers of the Warri kingdom. A tree is planted on each grave.

Sports
Delta State is known to have produced several sportsmen and women, notably Stephen Okechukwu Keshi, Sunday Ogochukwu Oliseh, Austin Jay-Jay Okocha, Wilson Oruma, Efetobore Sodje Blessing Okagbare, Jonathan Akpoborie, Alex Iwobi and Ogenekaro Etebo.

Notable people

Francis Agoda aka I Go Dye, popular comedian across Africa and United Nations' Millennium Development Goals Ambassador
Alibaba Akpobome, stand-up comedian and actor
Venita Akpofure, British-Nigerian actress and video vixen
Eyimofe Atake, Senior Advocate of Nigeria
FOM Atake, Nigerian Judge (1967-1977) and Senator of the Federal Republic of Nigeria (1979-1982)
Rt Rev'd John U Aruakpor Bishop, Anglican Diocese of Oleh
Michael Ashikodi Agbamuche, former Attorney General & Minister for Justice of Nigeria
Udoka Azubuike, professional basketball player for the Utah Jazz, played at college for the University of Kansas
Bovi, Nigerian comedian, event host, Actor and skit maker
John Pepper Clark, first professor of English in Africa, poet and writer
David Dafinone, Renowned Account/Politician
Paul Dike, Past Chief of Defence Staff
Enebeli Elebuwa, Nigerian Actor
Tony Elumelu, UBA and Heirs Holdings
Godwin Emefiele present CBN Governor
Olorogun O'tega Emerhor, Nigerian financial industry leader and politician
Ayiri Emami, is a Nigerian businessman, politician, and philanthropist.
Erigga, Nigerian Hip hop recording artist, songwriter
Oghenekaro Etebo, Nigerian professional footballer
Jeremiah Omoto Fufeyin, founder of Christ Mercyland Deliverance Ministry
Harrysong, Nigerian singer, songwriter and instrumentalist
James Ibori, former governor of Delta State
Michael Ibru, business leader
Alex Iwobi former Arsenal Fc Player and Current Everton Fc player
Dumebi Iyamah Owner of Andrea Iyamah Brand
Don Jazzy, Nigerian singer and producer
Emmanuel Ibe Kachikwu, former Minister of State, Petroleum Resources, Nigeria
Stephen Keshi, Nigerian ex-defender, former head coach of the super eagles
Festus Keyamo, Nigerian lawyer and a Senior Advocate of Nigeria SAN
Lynxxx, Recording artist, entrepreneur and the first Nigerian Pepsi brand ambassador
Senator James Manager Ebiowou, Nigerian politician at the Senate level 
Rosaline Meurer, Gambian-born Nigerian actress

Richard Mofe-Damijo, Nigerian veteran actor, writer, producer, and lawyer, former Commissioner for Culture and Tourism in Delta State
Collins Nweke, First non-Belgian born person elected to political office in West Flanders Belgium
Nduka Obaigbena Founder, ThisDay & AriseTV
Sam Obi, Ex-speaker and former acting governor of Delta State
Sunny Ofehe, international human & environmental rights activist
Kenneth Ogba, politician
Joy Ogwu, former Permanent Representative of Nigeria to the United Nations
Tanure Ojaide, professor of English and renowned writer
Mandy Ojugbana, musician
Okocha, former Super Eagles Captain
Blessing Okagbare, athlete, Olympic and World Athletics Championships medalist in the long jump, and a world medallist in the 200 metres
Ngozi Okonjo-Iweala, economist and international development expert, Boards of Standard Chartered Bank, Twitter, Global Alliance for Vaccines and Immunization, and the African Risk Capacity
Chris Okotie, Nigerian musician, televangelist, politician
Ben Okri, writer, Nigerian poet and novelist
Sunday Oliseh, Football Manager and former player
Omawumi, Nigerian singer, songwriter, actress; brand ambassador for Globacom, Konga, Malta Guinness
Ovie Omo-Agege, Nigerian lawyer, politician
Rachel Oniga, was a Nigerian film actress
Dominic Oneya, Retired Brigadier General in the Nigerian Army , former chairman of the Nigeria Football Association
John Esio Obada, Retired Major General in the Nigerian Army, Former Chief of Air Staff (CoAS), Former Chairman, Board of Trustees of the Urhobo Progress Union
Bruce Onobrakpeya, 2006 UNESCO Living Human Treasure Award, trustee of Western Niger Delta University
Gamaliel Onosode, Nigerian technocrat, administrator and a former presidential candidate

Orezi, singer, songwriter
Ayo Oritsejafor, founder of Word of Life Bible Church
Stephen Oru, Nigerian politician, former Minister of Niger Delta Affairs
Peter Godsday Orubebe, politician, ex-Minister of State for Niger Delta Affairs, ex-Minister of special duties
Dennis Osadebay, Nigerian politician, lawyer, poet, journalist
Prof Onigu Otite, sociologist and anthropologist
Jim Ovia, Nigerian businessman, founder of Zenith Bank
Tim Owhefere, Nigerian politician
Amaju Pinnick, president of the Nigeria Football Federation
Igho Sanomi, Nigerian businessman
SHiiKANE, Nigerian Afro-Pop, Pop, Afrobeat, Jazz, Dance, R&B music group
Zulu Sofola, First published female Nigerian playwright and dramatist, first female Professor of Theater Arts in Africa
Ojo Taiye, Nigerian poet, winner of the Kingdoms in the Wild 2019 Annual Poetry Prize
Tompolo, former Nigerian Militant Commander
Abel Ubeku, first black managing director of Guinness Nigeria Plc
Patrick Utomi, a Nigerian professor of political economy and management expert, Fellow of the Institute of Management Consultants of Nigeria and a former presidential candidate
Faithia Williams,  is a Nigerian actress, filmmaker, producer and director.

References

External links
 
 
 Governor of Delta State
 Delta State Newspaper

 
States of Nigeria
Niger River Delta
States and territories established in 1991